(Peter) Robin Turner, CB, DL, QHC, AKC (born 8 March 1942) is a British Anglican priest and retired military chaplain. From 1995 to 1998, he served as Chaplain-in-Chief, and thereby head of the Royal Air Force Chaplains Branch, and Archdeacon for the Royal Air Force.

Turner was educated at Dulwich College and King's College London. After a curacy in Crediton he served the RAF from 1970 to 1998. He was an Honorary Chaplain to the Queen from 1991 to 1998.

References

Church of England priests
20th-century English Anglican priests
21st-century English Anglican priests
Royal Air Force Chaplains-in-Chief
Alumni of King's College London
People educated at Dulwich College
Honorary Chaplains to the Queen
Companions of the Order of the Bath
Deputy Lieutenants of Nottinghamshire
1942 births
Living people